A Revenue division is an administrative division of some of the Indian states. It is a geographic area covering many tehsils, which in turn comprises villages. A revenue division is headed by a Revenue Divisional Officer, who exercises certain fiscal and administrative powers over its jurisdiction.

See also 
 Tehsildar
 Village accountant

References 

Types of administrative division
Administrative divisions of India